Firoja Bibi is an Indian politician belonging to All India Trinamool Congress. She served as legislator of Nandigram in West Bengal Legislative Assembly from 2009 to 2016. Later, she was elected as a legislator in West Bengal Legislative Assembly from Panskura Paschim.

References

Living people
Trinamool Congress politicians from West Bengal
West Bengal MLAs 2006–2011
West Bengal MLAs 2011–2016
West Bengal MLAs 2016–2021
Women in West Bengal politics
Year of birth missing (living people)
21st-century Indian women politicians